Joseph James Raccuia is an American college baseball coach and former player. Raccuia played college baseball at Edison Community College from 1992 to 1993 before transferring to Radford University where he played in 1994 and 1996. Raccuia was the head coach of Radford from 2008 to 2019.

Early life
Raccuia enrolled at Edison Community College, where he played for the baseball team.  In 1994, Raccuia accepted a scholarship to continue his playing career at Radford University.

As a junior at the Radford University in 1994, Raccuia had a .295 batting average, a .403 on-base percentage (OBP) and a .350 SLG.

As a senior in 1995, Raccuia batted .225 with a .316 SLG, 1 home run, and 18 RBIs.

Coaching career
Upon graduation, Raccuia was named an assistant at Radford. From 1997 to 2000, he spent four seasons as an assistant for the George Washington Colonials baseball program. Raccuia then spent three seasons as an assistant for the George Mason Patriots baseball team.

Marist
On September 16, 2003, Raccuia left George Mason to become the head baseball coach for the Marist Red Foxes baseball program. In 2005, he led the Red Foxes to a 33–21 record, winning the Metro Atlantic Athletic Conference (MAAC) both regular season and tournament. He was named the Co-MAAC Coach of the Year along with Tony Rossi.

Raccuia left Marist after two seasons to become an assistant for the Alabama Crimson Tide baseball program.

Radford
On July 11, 2007, Raccuia was named the head coach at Radford. On August 15, 2019, Raccuia resigned from his position at head coach at Radford. Raccuia lead Radford to 348 wins and to the only two NCAA tournament appearances in the program's history.

Head coaching record

References

External links
Radford Highlanders bio

Living people
Florida SouthWestern Buccaneers baseball players
Radford Highlanders baseball players
Radford Highlanders baseball coaches
George Washington Colonials baseball coaches
George Mason Patriots baseball coaches
Marist Red Foxes baseball coaches
Alabama Crimson Tide baseball coaches
1972 births